Allium senescens subsp. glaucum (German garlic), is a plant in the genus Allium. It is native to Siberia and Mongolia.

References

senescens glaucum
Plant subspecies